The Sensual Donovan is an album by Donovan consisting of lost recordings produced in 1971 by John Phillips of the Mamas and the Papas. His 25th studio album, it is the second 'buried treasure' release by Donovan in a continuing series.

Track listing
''All songs written by Donovan Leitch and published by Donovan Music /Peermusic 2012.
Only You
Amore
Two Lovers
Astrella
Amore (instrumental)
Hotel Lonely
Two Lovers (instrumental)
Open Up Your Heart
Astrella (instrumental)
Bonus Track: Dignity of Man

References
http://www.donovan.ie/en/2012/12/donovan-new-release-the-sensual-donovan/

2012 compilation albums
Donovan albums